Abbi Silver (born December 3, 1964) is an American attorney who served as a justice of the Nevada Supreme Court from 2019 to 2022.

Education 

Silver received her Bachelor of Arts in political science from the University of Nevada, Las Vegas in 1986 and her Juris Doctor from Southwestern Law School in Los Angeles, California.

Career 

After graduating law school, she worked as a judicial law clerk for Earle White, Jr. on the Eighth Judicial District Court. She then joined the Clark County District Attorney's Office and was ultimately assigned as the Chief Deputy District Attorney of the Special Victims Unit. During tenure at the District Attorney's office, she tried more than one hundred jury trials.

State judicial service 

Silver was elected to the Las Vegas Municipal Court in 2003, the Las Vegas Justice Court in 2006, and to the Eighth Judicial District Court in 2008, and again in 2014. She was appointed to the Nevada Court of Appeals by Governor Brian Sandoval on December 17, 2014, and was sworn in on January 5, 2015. On January 3, 2017, she became Chief Judge of the Court of Appeals.

Nevada Supreme Court 

Silver faced no challengers in the primary for the seat being vacated by Michael L. Douglas. She ran unopposed in the general election on November 8, 2018. She assumed office on January 7, 2019.  On August 26, 2022, she announced her resignation from the Supreme Court, citing "'unforeseen circumstances' and a desire to spend more time with her family[.]", effective September 29, 2022.

See also
List of first women lawyers and judges in Nevada

References

External links 

1964 births
Living people
20th-century American lawyers
20th-century American women lawyers
21st-century American judges
21st-century American women judges
Nevada lawyers
Nevada state court judges
Justices of the Nevada Supreme Court
Southwestern Law School alumni
University of Nevada, Las Vegas alumni